"Real Love" is a hit song by The Doobie Brothers, the first of three singles from their 1980 LP, One Step Closer.

"Real Love" became the greatest hit from the album, reaching #5 on the U.S. Billboard Hot 100 during the fall of the year. It is the group's third highest-charting U.S. single after their two number-one hits, "Black Water" and "What a Fool Believes". The song reached #12 in Canada.  It was also a Top 20 Adult Contemporary hit in both nations.

Record World said that its "blue-eyed soul and melodic keyboard finesse translate into another multi-format charttopper."

The song became the second of nine songs entitled "Real Love" charting on the U.S. Billboard Hot 100 between 1980 and 1996, with the final being the Beatles hit. It is also the second biggest hit with this title, behind Jody Watley's.

Personnel
Michael McDonald — keyboards, organ, synthesizers, vocals
Patrick Simmons — guitar, background vocals
John McFee — guitar, background vocals
Cornelius Bumpus — tenor saxophone, background vocals
Tiran Porter — bass guitar, background vocals
Keith Knudsen — drums, background vocals
 Chester McCracken — drums

Additional Personnel
Bobby LaKind — congas, bongos, background vocals
Nicolette Larson – background vocals
Patrick Henderson – keyboards
Jimmie Haskell –  string arrangements

Chart history

Weekly charts

Year-end charts

References

External links
 

1980 songs
1980 singles
The Doobie Brothers songs
Songs written by Michael McDonald (musician)
Warner Records singles
Song recordings produced by Ted Templeman